The Sanjrani are a Baloch tribe of Rind origin settled in Balochistan and Sindh provinces of Pakistan.  

The Chief of Chagai title belongs to Sanjrani tribe based in Dalbandin. In the British colonial era, District Chagai was known as State of Chaghai. The present chief of Chagai and Sardar of Sanjrani tribe is Sardar Hakeem Ali Sanjrani.

Notable people 
 Current Chairman of the Senate of Pakistan, Sadiq Sanjrani
 Former Minister and Ambassador to Kenya, Abdul Qadir Sanjrani 
 Former Chief Secretary Sindh Muhammad Aslam Sanjrani

See also
Sanjrani Chiefdom

References

Baloch tribes